Whoever Softer is a feature film director by Abay Karpykov.

Plot 
A young man by the name of Danesh is hospitalized with a broken leg. An old man, his roommate at the hospital ward, tells Danesh about two relics: tamga (gold plate) and a ruby. Once a year with their help it is possible to find treasure in the Canyon of Scorpio. Tamga was brought from abroad by Arab sheikhs, who are waiting for a messenger from the old man. After the old man's death, his sisters give Danesh the ruby and map of the Canyon and he goes off in search of treasure. Ramazan, a bandit who kidnapped translator Alyona, who can read the Arabic inscription on the tamga, becomes Danesh's opponent.

Cast
 Bopesh Jandaev as Danesh
 Kseniya Kachalina as Alyona
 Nikolay Stotsky as Gosha
 Andrei Rostotsky as Ramazan
 Farhat Abdraimov as Farhat 
 Bolot Beyshenaliyev as Sultan Khan Giray
 Aristarkh Livanov as Baigali

Critical reception
 Sergey Kudryavtsev:
One review said that at first, everything is unnecessarily meaningful, full of secrets and omissions. In the history of rivalry between two hard-hearted Kazakh brothers because of someone else's wealth, there is a lot of seriousness and pomposity that is not appropriate; is felt primarily in the behavior of Russian actors  Andrei Rostotsky and  Aristarkh Livanov. Paradoxically, the debutante  Farhat Abdraimov makes a mocking and good-natured element of everything happening in the comic role of a seemingly formidable fat man who has an unexpectedly thin voice and a completely mild temper.
.

References

External links

1996 films
Russian drama films
Films scored by Leonid Desyatnikov
1996 drama films
Kazakhstani drama films